Telephlebiidae is a family of dragonflies
endemic to eastern and south-western Australia.
They are medium-sized to very large dragonflies, generally found around streams.

The family Telephlebiidae is not recognised in the World Odonata List at the Slater Museum of Natural History, but rather its species are considered to be part of the Aeshnidae family.

Genera
The family includes the following genera:

 Acanthaeschna 
 Antipodophlebia 
 Austroaeschna 
 Austrophlebia 
 Dromaeschna 
 Notoaeschna 
 Spinaeschna 
 Telephlebia

References

 
Odonata families
Odonata of Australia
Endemic fauna of Australia
Insects described in 1913